In physics, a center of gravity of a material body is a point that may be used for a summary description of gravitational interactions. In a uniform gravitational field, the center of mass serves as the center of gravity. This is a very good approximation for smaller bodies near the surface of Earth, so there is no practical need to distinguish "center of gravity" from "center of mass" in most applications, such as engineering and medicine.

In a non-uniform field, gravitational effects such as potential energy, force, and torque can no longer be calculated using the center of mass alone. In particular, a non-uniform gravitational field can produce a torque on an object, even about an axis through the center of mass. The center of gravity seeks to explain this effect. Formally, a center of gravity is an application point of the resultant gravitational force on the body. Such a point may not exist, and if it exists, it is not unique. One can further define a unique center of gravity by approximating the field as either parallel or spherically symmetric.

The concept of a center of gravity as distinct from the center of mass is rarely used in applications, even in celestial mechanics, where non-uniform fields are important. Since the center of gravity depends on the external field, its motion is harder to determine than the motion of the center of mass. The common method to deal with gravitational torques is a field theory.

Center of mass

One way to define the center of gravity of a body is as the unique point in the body if it exists, that satisfies the following requirement: There is no torque about the point for any positioning of the body in the field of force in which it is placed. This center of gravity exists only when the force is uniform, in which case it coincides with the center of mass. This approach dates back to Archimedes.

Centers of gravity in a field
When a body is affected by a non-uniform external gravitational field, one can sometimes define a center of gravity relative to that field that will act as a point where the gravitational force is applied. Textbooks such as The Feynman Lectures on Physics characterize the center of gravity as a point about which there is no torque. In other words, the center of gravity is a point of application for the resultant force. Under this formulation, the center of gravity  is defined as a point that satisfies the equation

One complication concerning  is that its defining equation is not generally solvable.

If the equation is solvable, there is another complication: its solutions are not unique. Instead, there are infinitely many solutions; the set of all solutions is known as the line of action of the force. This line is parallel to the weight . In general, there is no way to choose a particular point as the unique center of gravity. A single point may still be chosen in some special cases, such as if the gravitational field is parallel or spherically symmetric. These cases are considered below.

Parallel fields
Some of the inhomogeneity in a gravitational field may be modeled by a variable but parallel field: , where  is some constant unit vector. Although a non-uniform gravitational field cannot be exactly parallel, this approximation can be valid if the body is sufficiently small. The center of gravity may then be defined as a certain weighted average of the locations of the particles composing the body. Whereas the center of mass averages over the mass of each particle, the center of gravity averages over the weight of each particle:

This equation always has a unique solution, and in the parallel-field approximation, it is compatible with the torque requirement.

A common illustration concerns the Moon in the field of the Earth. Using the weighted-average definition, the Moon has a center of gravity that is lower (closer to the Earth) than its center of mass, because its lower portion is more strongly influenced by the Earth's gravity. This eventually lead to the Moon always showing the same face, a phenomenon known as tidal locking.

Spherically symmetric fields
If the external gravitational field is spherically symmetric, then it is equivalent to the field of a point mass  at the center of symmetry . In this case, the center of gravity can be defined as the point at which the total force on the body is given by Newton's Law:

As long as the total force is nonzero, this equation has a unique solution, and it satisfies the torque requirement. A convenient feature of this definition is that if the body is itself spherically symmetric, then  lies at its center of mass.

For this reason,  is sometimes referred to as the center of gravity of  relative to the point .

Usage
The centers of gravity defined above are not fixed points on the body; rather, they change as the position and orientation of the body changes. This characteristic makes the center of gravity difficult to work with, so the concept has little practical use.

When it is necessary to consider a gravitational torque, it is easier to represent gravity as a force acting at the center of mass, plus an orientation-dependent couple. The latter is best approached by treating the gravitational potential as a field.

Notes

References

 

Classical mechanics
Gravity